Phillip Wayne Hunt, Jr. (born January 10, 1986) is a Canadian football outside linebacker for the Edmonton Eskimos of the Canadian Football League (CFL). He was originally signed by the Cleveland Browns as an undrafted free agent in 2009, and played college football for the Houston Cougars. He played for the Winnipeg Blue Bombers from 2009 to 2010, and the Philadelphia Eagles from 2011 to 2013.

Professional career

Cleveland Browns
In 2009 Hunt was signed as an undrafted free agent by the Browns, but was released before regular season.

Winnipeg Blue Bombers
After his release from the Browns prior to the 2009 season, Hunt signed with the Winnipeg Blue Bombers of the Canadian Football League (CFL) and spent two years with the Blue Bombers. In his first season, he recorded 11 tackles and three sacks, while he led the league in sacks with 16 the following year.

Philadelphia Eagles
Multiple NFL teams gave Hunt interest and invited him to workouts, including the Eagles, which after the 2010 season signed Hunt to a three-year contract on February 11, 2011. Hunt tore his ACL during the Eagles' first preseason game on August 9, 2013. He was placed on injured reserve on August 28, 2013, and became a free agent following the season.

Indianapolis Colts
On August 6, 2014, he was signed by the Indianapolis Colts, but failed to make the roster out of training camp and spent the 2014 season as a free agent.

Detroit Lions
On February 27, 2015, the Detroit Lions signed Hunt to a one-year contract. Hunt made the Lions roster out of training camp as a defensive end. He was cut on October 8, 2015.

New Orleans Saints
On November 23, 2015, the New Orleans Saints signed Hunt to a one-year $758,000 deal. On May 9, 2016, the Saints released Hunt.

Edmonton Eskimos 
On September 6, 2016, signed with the Edmonton Eskimos of the Canadian Football League.

Personal life
Phillip and his wife Krystal have 3 children and call Houston home during the off season.

References

External links
Philadelphia Eagles bio
Houston Cougars bio

1986 births
American football defensive ends
American football linebackers
American players of Canadian football
Canadian football defensive linemen
Cleveland Browns players
Detroit Lions players
Edmonton Elks players
Houston Cougars football players
Indianapolis Colts players
Living people
New Orleans Saints players
People from Fort Worth, Texas
Philadelphia Eagles players
Players of American football from Texas
Winnipeg Blue Bombers players